Franz Urlesberger (born 26 October 1972) is an Austrian sailor. He competed in the Laser event at the 1996 Summer Olympics.

References

External links
 

1972 births
Living people
Austrian male sailors (sport)
Olympic sailors of Austria
Sailors at the 1996 Summer Olympics – Laser
Sportspeople from Salzburg